Mervin Matthew was born 23 September 1985 in Dominica and was a member of the West Indies cricket team who took part in the Under 19 Cricket World Cup in Bangladesh in 2004. He has played first-class and List A cricket for the Windward Islands.

References

1985 births
Living people
Windward Islands cricketers
People from Saint Mark Parish, Dominica
Dominica cricketers